Empress Liang (梁皇后) (died 355) was briefly an empress of the Di-led Chinese Former Qin dynasty. Her husband was the violent and arbitrary Fu Sheng.

In 355, after Fu Sheng succeeded his father Fu Jiàn, the founding emperor of Former Qin, he created her empress.  (Presumably, she had been Fu Sheng's wife earlier during his stints as the Prince of Huainan and as crown prince, and carried a princess title.)  Her uncle Mao Gui (毛貴) and father Liang An (梁安) were both officials who, under Fu Jiàn's will, served as major officials of the state. Another such official, Liang Leng (梁楞), was likely her father's brother or cousin.

Just three months after she became empress, however, disaster came. Fu Sheng's astrologers warned him that the stars showed that a great funeral and deaths of major officials would come within three years, and that he therefore should reform his ways to avoid such disasters. Instead, Fu Sheng declared that the empress's death and the deaths of some major officials would be sufficient to satisfy the signs, and he executed Empress Liang, Mao Gui, Liang An, and Liang Leng.

References 

Former Qin empresses
355 deaths
Year of birth unknown
Executed royalty